Doomed at Sundown is a 1937 American Western film directed by Sam Newfield and written by George H. Plympton. The film stars Bob Steele, Lorraine Randall, Warner Richmond, Earl Dwire, Harold Daniels and David Sharpe. The film was released on July 7, 1937, by Republic Pictures.

Plot
Dave Austin is the son of the Sheriff, when his father gets killed with a knife Dave takes his badge and starts searching for the man who killed his father.

Cast
Bob Steele as Dave Austin
Lorraine Randall as Jean Williams
Warner Richmond as Jim Hatfield
Earl Dwire as Butch Brawley 
Harold Daniels as Dante Sprague
David Sharpe as Don Williams
Horace B. Carpenter as Lew Sprague

References

External links
 

1937 films
American Western (genre) films
1937 Western (genre) films
Republic Pictures films
Films directed by Sam Newfield
American black-and-white films
Films with screenplays by George H. Plympton
1930s English-language films
1930s American films